Kornél Béke (born 2 December 1998) is a Hungarian canoeist. He competed in the men's K-2 1000 metres event at the 2020 Summer Olympics.

References

External links
 

1998 births
Living people
Hungarian male canoeists
Olympic canoeists of Hungary
Canoeists at the 2020 Summer Olympics
Place of birth missing (living people)
21st-century Hungarian people